Ullibarri de los Olleros in Spanish or Uribarri Nagusia in Basque is a village in Álava, Basque Country, Spain. 

Populated places in Álava